Saint Armel ( "Wolf-Prince") was an early 6th-century holy man in Brittany.

Armel is said to have been a Breton prince, born to the wife of King Hoel while they were living in Glamorgan in Wales in the late 5th century. He founded the abbey of Plouarzel in Brittany and was, from there, called to attend the court of King Childebert I of Paris. On the journey, he established churches at Ergué-Armel, Plouharnel and Saint-Armel which remember his name. He remained seven years at the royal court, curing the lame and the blind. The king gave him land at Saint-Armel-des-Bochaux in Ille-et-Vilaine where he founded a second monastery. He then removed himself to the Forest of Teil and is said to have defeated a dragon which was terrorising the area. He died in his monastery around 570. His feast day is 16 August. It has been questioned whether or not Saint Armel could have actually been King Arthur. Some writers have identified Athrwys ap Meurig as a potential historical basis for King Arthur. This identification is found at least as early as Thomas Carte's A General History of England, written in 1747. It was later put forward and popularised by William Owen Pughe in 1803. The theory subsequently gained more popularity during the 19th century. 
After the battle of Camlann, Armel would have retired to his duties as a monk, and achieved his title of Saint.

6th-century Christian saints
Medieval Breton saints
People from Glamorgan
Medieval Welsh saints
570 deaths
Year of birth unknown
6th-century Breton people